Harold Young may refer to:

Harold Young (politician) (1923–2006), Australian Senate member, 1968–1983
Harold Young (director) (1897–1972), American film director
 Hal Young (1890-1970), British cinematographer
Harold Young (rugby league), rugby league footballer of the 1920s and 1930s

See also
Harry Young (disambiguation)